Tornquist Partido is a partido in the southwest of Buenos Aires Province in Argentina and is named after Ernesto Tornquist, founder of Tornquist, the partido's main city.

Economy

The economy of Tornquist is dominated by farming, the main agricultural products are: wheat, barley, oats, maize, sunflower, soybeans and sorghum.

There is also large scale production of beef and dairy products, and smaller scale production of pork, chicken, sheep and honey.

Settlements
Berraondo 
Chasicó
Choique 
Estomba 
García del Río 
Nueva Roma 
Pelicura 
Saldungaray 
Tornquist
Sierra de La Ventana 
Villa Serrana La Gruta
Villa Ventana

External links

 

1910 establishments in Argentina
Partidos of Buenos Aires Province
Populated places established in 1910
Volga German diaspora